Stone Avenue (also known as La Grange-Stone Avenue) is a station on Metra's BNSF Line in La Grange, Illinois. In Metra's zone-based fare system, Stone Avenue is in zone C. As of 2018, Stone Avenue is the 55th busiest of Metra's 236 non-downtown stations, with an average of 946 weekday boardings. A staffed station building is on the south side of the three tracks.

Like the other La Grange Metra station (La Grange Road), La Grange-Stone Avenue is between West Burlington and West Hillgrove Avenues. Stone Avenue, the road for which the station is named, is actually a minor street which terminates at West Burlington Avenue in front of the station, only to begin again at a dead end street south of Bell Avenue. The closest major street to the station is Brainard Avenue. The station is within walking distance of the North Campus of Lyons Township High School.

The station was built in 1901 by the Chicago, Burlington and Quincy Railroad according to a Richardsonian Romanesque design by the company's general architect, Walter Theodore Krausch.

References

External links 

Image of Eastbound Train @ La Grange/Stone Avenue Station (Metra Railfans)
Station from Brainard Avenue from Google Maps Street View

La Grange, Illinois
Metra stations in Illinois
Former Chicago, Burlington and Quincy Railroad stations
Railway stations in Cook County, Illinois
Railway stations in the United States opened in 1901